Jakub Kochanowski (born 17 July 1997) is a Polish professional volleyball player. He is a member of the Poland national team, a participant in the Olympic Games Tokyo 2020, 2018 World Champion, and the 2021 Champions League winner. At the professional club level, he plays for Asseco Resovia.

Career

Clubs
On 10 May 2018, after a successful season in Indykpol AZS Olsztyn, and achieving 4th place in the league, he was announced as a new player of PGE Skra Bełchatów. In 2020, Kochanowski joined ZAKSA Kędzierzyn-Koźle.

National team
On 12 April 2015, the Poland national U19 team, including Kochanowski, won a title of the U19 European Champions. They beat Italy in the final (3–1). In the same year, he also took part in the European Youth Olympic Festival, and on 1 August 2015 achieved a gold medal after the final match  with Bulgaria (3–0). On 23 August 2015, Poland achieved its first title of the U19 World Champion. In the final his team beat Argentina.

On 10 September 2016, he achieved a title of the U20 European Champion after winning 7 out of 7 matches at the tournament, and beating Ukraine in the final (3–1). On 2 July 2017, Poland, including Kochanowski, achieved a title of the U21 World Champion, after beating Cuba in the final (3–0). Kochanowski was awarded an individual award for the Most Valuable Player of the whole tournament. His national team won 47 matches in the row and never lost. The U21 World Champion title ended his time in youth national teams.

In April 2017, for the first time in his career, he was called up for the senior national team by the head coach of that time – Ferdinando De Giorgi. Kochanowski joined the team at the 2017 World League before the first week of competition because of Andrzej Wrona's injury. He debuted in the senior national team on 3 June 2017, in the match against Italy (3–1).

On 30 September 2018, Poland achieved its 3rd title of the World Champion. Poland beat Brazil in the final (3–0), and defended the title from 2014.

Honours

Clubs
 CEV Champions League
  2020/2021 – with ZAKSA Kędzierzyn-Koźle
 National championships
 2018/2019  Polish SuperCup, with PGE Skra Bełchatów
 2020/2021  Polish SuperCup, with ZAKSA Kędzierzyn-Koźle
 2020/2021  Polish Cup, with ZAKSA Kędzierzyn-Koźle

Youth national team
 2014  CEV U20 European Championship
 2015  CEV U19 European Championship
 2015  European Youth Olympic Festival
 2015  FIVB U19 World Championship
 2016  CEV U20 European Championship
 2017  FIVB U21 World Championship

Individual awards
 2017: FIVB U21 World Championship – Most Valuable Player

State awards
 2018:  Gold Cross of Merit

References

External links

 
 Player profile at PlusLiga.pl 
 
 Player profile at Volleybox.net

1997 births
Living people
People from Giżycko
Sportspeople from Warmian-Masurian Voivodeship
Polish men's volleyball players
Olympic volleyball players of Poland
Volleyball players at the 2020 Summer Olympics
AZS Olsztyn players
Skra Bełchatów players
ZAKSA Kędzierzyn-Koźle players
Resovia (volleyball) players
Middle blockers